Kim Kwang-rae (born 2 December 1973) is a South Korean cross-country skier. He competed in the men's 10 kilometre classical event at the 1992 Winter Olympics.

References

1973 births
Living people
South Korean male cross-country skiers
Olympic cross-country skiers of South Korea
Cross-country skiers at the 1992 Winter Olympics
Place of birth missing (living people)